Kinga Horváth (born 13 November 1976) is a Hungarian gymnast. She competed in six events at the 1992 Summer Olympics.

References

1976 births
Living people
Hungarian female artistic gymnasts
Olympic gymnasts of Hungary
Gymnasts at the 1992 Summer Olympics
Gymnasts from Budapest